Russobit-M is defunct distributor of PC games in Russia and the CIS. It served an important role in PC game distribution in the Post-Soviet states. In 2003 it partnered with GFI to release game software and DVDs throughout Russia.

Russobit-M was established in 1999 and quite soon became the major publisher and distributor in the Russian and CIS game markets. The company employed more than two hundred game specialists and had over one hundred partners worldwide at its peak. By the time the company stopped operating, it had sold five million CD/DVDs on the local market.

In 2003, the company combined efforts with GFI. GFI served the role of the publisher and developer and Russobit-M functioned as a distributor. In May 2008 Russobit-M and GFI had merged into the Bestway group. In October 2008 Play Ten Interactive had been incorporated into the group.

The company released 900 projects, including 100 developed by Russian companies. 

It was closed 15 April 2013.

Games published 

 W.A.R Soldiers
 The Precursors
 White Gold
 Neuro
 Ancient Wars: Sparta
 Fate of Hellas
 The Golden Horde
 Homeplanet
 TMNT
 Claw_(video_game)
 Worms: Armageddon
 Cultures 2: The Gates of Asgard
 Nuclear Titbit: Flashback
 Brothers
 M.I.A.: Mission in Asia

References

External links 

 Official site 
 Russobit-M at MobyGames
 Russian Wikipedia page

Defunct video game companies of Russia
Companies based in Moscow
Video game companies of Russia